Gordon S. Brown (born March 19, 1963) is a former American football running back who played for the Indianapolis Colts of the National Football League. He played college football at the University of Tulsa.

References

1963 births
Living people
American football running backs
Tulsa Golden Hurricane football players
Indianapolis Colts players
Players of American football from Philadelphia